Mikhail Anatolyevich Smirnov (born 10 August 1967) is a former Belarusian football player.

Honours
Dinamo Minsk
Belarusian Premier League champion: 1992–93, 1993–94
Belarusian Cup winner: 1993–94

External links
 

1967 births
Footballers from Minsk
Living people
Soviet footballers
Association football midfielders
Belarusian footballers
Belarusian expatriate footballers
Expatriate footballers in Poland
Expatriate footballers in Russia
Expatriate footballers in Germany
Russian Premier League players
Navbahor Namangan players
FC Dnepr Mogilev players
Zawisza Bydgoszcz players
FC Dinamo Minsk players
FC Torpedo Moscow players
Stuttgarter Kickers players
SV Eintracht Trier 05 players
SG Sonnenhof Großaspach players
SpVgg Ludwigsburg players
FC SKVICH Minsk players
FK Pirmasens players